Killip is a surname of Manx origin, meaning "Philip's son". Notable people with the surname include:

 Ben Killip (born 1995), English footballer
 Bert Killip, British socialist activist
 Ellsworth Paine Killip (1890–1968), American botanist
 Chris Killip (1946–2020), Manx photographer

Manx-language surnames
Patronymic surnames
Surnames from given names